El clásico is a 2015 Iraqi-Norwegian drama film directed by Halkawt Mustafa. It was selected as the Iraqi entry for the Best Foreign Language Film at the 89th Academy Awards but was not nominated.

Cast
 Wrya Ahmed as Alan
 Dana Ahmes as Shirwan
 Kamaran Raoof as Jalal
 Rozhin Sharifi as Gona

See also
 List of submissions to the 89th Academy Awards for Best Foreign Language Film
 List of Iraqi submissions for the Academy Award for Best Foreign Language Film
 Kurdish cinema

References

External links
 

2015 films
2015 drama films
Iraqi drama films
Norwegian drama films
Kurdish-language films